The Tamarind restaurant is an Indian restaurant in Mayfair, London, opened in 1995. It won a Michelin star in 2001, the first Indian restaurant to do so. The Tatler describes it as beautiful, "sophisticated, lively and oddly romantic", and as suitable for clinching a business deal as a grand Sunday lunch or a lover's "light supper". The Michelin Guide calls the cuisine "appealing northern Indian food" and "of great finesse". Jonathan Gold, in the Los Angeles Times, wrote that he had been impressed by its "frank attempt to produce Indian food with the sheen and polish of white-tablecloth European cuisine", though he chiefly recalled "the wine list, the flowers, and the cost."

See also
 English cuisine

References

External links
 Website

Indian restaurants in London
Michelin Guide starred restaurants in the United Kingdom